Northern Lapland is a subdivision of Finnish Lapland and one of the Sub-regions of Finland since 2009. It is the largest and most sparsely populated sub-region in Finland.

Municipalities
 Inari
 Sodankylä
 Utsjoki

Politics
Results of the 2018 Finnish presidential election:

 Sauli Niinistö   56.9%
 Paavo Väyrynen   14.9%
 Pekka Haavisto   8.2%
 Matti Vanhanen   6.7%
 Laura Huhtasaari   5.5%
 Merja Kyllönen   5.2%
 Tuula Haatainen   2.0%
 Nils Torvalds   0.5%

Sub-regions of Finland
Lapland (Finland)